Guinea, officially the Republic of Guinea, is a coastal country in West Africa. It borders the Atlantic Ocean to the west, Guinea-Bissau to the northwest, Senegal to the north, Mali to the northeast, Cote d'Ivoire to the southeast, and Sierra Leone and Liberia to the south. It is sometimes referred to as Guinea-Conakry after its capital Conakry, to distinguish it from other territories in the eponymous region such as Guinea-Bissau and Equatorial Guinea.

Formerly French Guinea, it achieved independence in 1958. It has a history of military coups d'état. After decades of authoritarian rule, in 2010 it held its first democratic election. As it continued to hold multi-party elections, the country continued to face ethnic conflicts, corruption, and abuses by military and police. In 2011, the United States government claimed that torture by security forces and abuse of women and children (including female genital mutilation) were ongoing human rights issues. In 2021, a military faction overthrew president Alpha Condé and suspended the constitution.

Muslims represent 85% of the population. The country is divided into four geographic regions: Maritime Guinea on the Atlantic coast, the Fouta Djallon or Middle Guinea highlands, the Upper Guinea savanna region in the northeast, and the Guinée forestière region of tropical forests. French, the official language of Guinea, is a language of communication in schools, in government administration, and the media. More than 24 indigenous languages are spoken and the largest are Susu, Pular, and Maninka, which dominate respectively in Maritime Guinea, Fouta Djallon, and Upper Guinea, while Guinée forestière is ethnolinguistically diverse. Guinea's economy is mostly dependent on agriculture and mineral production. It is the world's second largest producer of bauxite, and has deposits of diamonds and gold. The country was at the core of the 2014 Ebola outbreak.

Name

Guinea is named after the Guinea region which lies along the Gulf of Guinea. It stretches north through the forested tropical regions and ends at the Sahel. The English term Guinea comes directly from the Portuguese word Guiné which emerged in the mid-15th century to refer to the lands inhabited by the Guineus, a generic term for the black African peoples south of the Senegal River, in contrast to the "tawny" Zenaga Berbers above it, whom they called Azenegues or Moors.

History

The land that is now Guinea belonged to a series of African empires until France colonized it in the 1890s, and made it part of French West Africa. Guinea declared its independence from France on 2 October 1958. From independence until the presidential election of 2010, Guinea was governed by a number of autocratic rulers.

West African empires and kingdoms

What is now Guinea was on the fringes of some West African empires. The earliest, the Ghana Empire, grew on trade and ultimately fell after repeated incursions of the Almoravids. It was in this period that Islam first arrived in the region by way of North African traders.

The Mali Empire was ruled by Mansa (Emperors), including Kankou Moussa who made a hajj to Mecca in 1324. After his reign, the Mali Empire began to decline and was ultimately supplanted by its vassal states in the 15th century.

The Songhai Empire expanded its power from about 1460 and eventually surpassed the Mali Empire in both territory and wealth. It continued to prosper until a civil war, over succession, followed the death of Askia Daoud in 1582. The empire fell to invaders from Morocco at the Battle of Tondibi 3 years later. The Moroccans proved unable to rule the kingdom effectively and it split into smaller kingdoms.

After the fall of some of the West African empires, various kingdoms existed in what is now Guinea. Fulani Muslims migrated to Futa Jallon in Central Guinea, and established an Islamic state from 1727 to 1896, with a written constitution and alternate rulers. The Wassoulou or Wassulu Empire (1878–1898) was led by Samori Toure in the predominantly Malinké area of what is now upper Guinea and southwestern Mali (Wassoulou). It moved to Ivory Coast before being conquered by the French.

Colony
European traders competed for the cape trade from the 17th century onward and made inroads earlier. Slaves were exported to work elsewhere. The traders used the regional slave practices.

Guinea's colonial period began with French military penetration into the area in the mid-19th century. French domination was assured by the defeat in 1898 of the armies of Samori Touré, Mansa (or Emperor) of the Ouassoulou state and leader of Malinké descent, which gave France control of what today is Guinea and adjacent areas.

France negotiated Guinea's present boundaries in the late 19th and early 20th centuries with the British for Sierra Leone, the Portuguese for their Guinea colony (now Guinea-Bissau), and Liberia. Under the French, the country formed the Territory of Guinea within French West Africa, administered by a governor general resident in Dakar. Lieutenant governors administered the individual colonies, including Guinea.

In 1958, the French Fourth Republic collapsed due to political instability and its failures in dealing with its colonies, especially Indochina and Algeria. The French Fifth Republic gave the colonies the choice of autonomy in a new French Community or immediate independence, in the referendum of 28 September 1958. Unlike most other colonies, Guinea voted overwhelmingly for independence. It was led by Ahmed Sékou Touré whose Democratic Party of Guinea-African Democratic Rally (PDG) had won 56 of 60 seats in 1957 territorial elections. The French withdrew, and on 2 October 1958, Guinea proclaimed itself a sovereign and independent republic, with Sékou Touré as president.

The Washington Post observed the "brutal" French tearing down all that they considered their contributions to Guinea: "In reaction, and as a warning to other French-speaking territories, the French pulled out of Guinea over a two-month period, taking everything they could with them. They unscrewed lightbulbs, removed plans for sewage pipelines in Conakry, the capital, and even burned medicines rather than leave them for the Guineans."

Post-colonial (1958–)

Subsequently, Guinea aligned itself with the Soviet Union and adopted socialist policies. It then moved towards a Chinese model of socialism. It continued to receive investment from capitalist countries, such as the United States. By 1960, Touré had declared PDG the country's only legal political party, and for the next 24 years, the government and PDG were one. Touré was re-elected unopposed to 4 7-year terms as president, and every 5 years voters were presented with a single list of PDG candidates for the National Assembly. Advocating a hybrid African Socialism domestically and Pan-Africanism abroad, Touré became a polarising leader, with his government becoming intolerant of dissent, imprisoning thousands, and stifling the press.

Throughout the 1960s, the Guinean government nationalised land, removed French-appointed and traditional chiefs from power, and had strained ties with the French government and French companies. Touré's government relied on the Soviet Union and China for infrastructure aid and development, and much of this was used for political and not economic purposes, such as the building of stadiums to hold political rallies.

On 22 November 1970, Portuguese forces from neighbouring Portuguese Guinea staged Operation Green Sea, a raid on Conakry by several hundred exiled Guinean opposition forces. Among their goals, the Portuguese military wanted to kill or capture Sekou Touré due to his support of PAIGC, an independence movement and rebel group that had carried out attacks inside Portuguese Guinea from their bases in Guinea. After some fighting, the Portuguese-backed forces retreated, having freed several dozen Portuguese prisoners of war that were being held by PAIGC in Conakry, and without having ousted Touré. In the years after the raid, purges were carried out by the Touré government, and at least 50 thousand people were killed. Others were imprisoned and faced torture. Some foreigners were forced to leave the country, after having had their Guinean spouse arrested and their children placed into state custody.

Guinea was elected as a non-permanent member of the UN Security Council 1972–73.

In 1977, a declining economy, mass killings, a stifling political atmosphere, and a ban on all private economic transactions led to the Market Women's Revolt, a series of anti-government riots started by women working in Conakry's Madina Market. This prompted Touré to make major reforms. Touré vacillated from supporting the Soviet Union to supporting the United States. The late 1970s and early 1980s saw some economic reforms, while Touré's centralized control of the state remained. In the relationship with France, after the election of Valéry Giscard d'Estaing as French president, trade increased and the 2 countries exchanged diplomatic visits.

Sékou Touré died on 26 March 1984, after a heart operation in the United States, and was replaced by Prime Minister Louis Lansana Beavogui, who was to serve as interim president, pending new elections. PDG was due to elect a new leader on 3 April 1984. Under the constitution, that person would have been the only candidate for president. Hours before that meeting, Colonels Lansana Conté and Diarra Traoré seized power in a bloodless coup. Conté assumed the role of president, with Traoré serving as prime minister, until December.

Conté denounced the previous regime's record on human rights, releasing 250 political prisoners and encouraging approximately 200 thousand more to return from exile. He made explicit the turn away from socialism.

In 1992, Conté announced a return to civilian rule, with a presidential poll in 1993, followed by elections to parliament in 1995 (in which his party—the Party of Unity and Progress—won 71 of 114 seats.) In September 2001, the opposition leader Alpha Condé was imprisoned for endangering state security and pardoned 8 months later. Subsequently, he spent time in exile in France.

In 2001, Conté organized and won a referendum to lengthen the presidential term, and in 2003, began his third term after elections were boycotted by the opposition. In January 2005, Conté survived a suspected assassination attempt while making a public appearance in the capital of Conakry. His opponents claimed that he was a "tired dictator", whose departure was inevitable, whereas his supporters believed that he was winning a battle with dissidents. According to Foreign Policy, Guinea was in danger of becoming a failed state.

In 2000, Guinea suffered from the instability which had blighted the rest of West Africa, as rebels crossed the borders with Liberia and Sierra Leone. It seemed that the country was headed for civil war. Conté blamed neighbouring leaders for coveting Guinea's natural resources, and these claims were denied. In 2003, Guinea agreed to plans with her neighbours to tackle the insurgents. The 2007 Guinean general strike resulted in the appointment of a new prime minister.

Conté remained in power until his death on 23 December 2008. Several hours after his death, Moussa Dadis Camara seized control in a coup, declaring himself head of a military junta. Protests against the coup became violent, and 157 people were killed when, on 28 September 2009, the junta ordered its soldiers to attack people gathered to protest Camara's attempt to become president. The soldiers went on a rampage of rape, mutilation, and murder, which caused some foreign governments to withdraw their support for the new regime.

On 3 December 2009, an aide shot Camara during a dispute over the rampage in September. Camara went to Morocco for medical care. Vice-president (and defense minister) Sékouba Konaté flew from Lebanon to run the country. After meeting in Ouagadougou on 13 and 14 January 2010, Camara, Konaté and Blaise Compaoré, President of Burkina Faso, produced a formal statement of 12 principles promising a return of Guinea to civilian rule within 6 months. The presidential election of 27 June brought allegations of fraud, and a second election was held on 7 November. Voter turnout was "high", and the elections went "relatively smoothly". Alpha Condé, leader of the opposition party Rally of the Guinean People (RGP), won the election, promising to reform the security sector and review mining contracts.

In February 2013, political violence erupted after street protests over transparency of upcoming May elections. The protests were fueled by the opposition coalition's decision to step down from the elections, in protest of the lack of transparency in the preparations for elections. 9 people were killed during the protests, and around 220 were injured. Some deaths and injuries were caused by security forces using live ammunition on protesters. The violence led to ethnic clashes between the Malinke and Fula, who supported and opposed President Condé, respectively. On 26 March 2013, the opposition party backed out of negotiations with the government over the election, saying that the government had not respected them, and had broken all agreements.
On 25 March 2014, the World Health Organization stated that Guinea's Ministry of Health had reported an outbreak of Ebola virus disease in Guinea. This initial outbreak had 86 cases, including 59 deaths. By 28 May, there were 281 cases, with 186 deaths. It is believed that the first case was Emile Ouamouno, a 2-year-old boy in the village of Meliandou. He fell ill on 2 December 2013 and died on 6 December. On 18 September 2014, 8 members of an Ebola education health care team were murdered by villagers in the town of Womey. As of 1 November 2015, there had been 3,810 cases and 2,536 deaths in Guinea.

The 2019–2020 Guinean protests were a series of violent protests and mass civil unrest against the rule of Alpha Conde that broke out on October 14, 2019, against constitutional changes. More than 800 were killed in clashes. After the 2020 Guinean presidential election, Alpha Condé's election to a third term was challenged by the opposition, who accused him of fraud. Condé claimed a constitutional referendum from March 2020 allowed him to run despite the 2-term limit.

On 5 September 2021, after hours of gunfire near the presidential palace, Lieutenant Colonel Mamady Doumbouya seized control of state television and declared that President Alpha Conde's government had been dissolved and the nation's borders closed. By the evening, the putschists declared control of all Conakry and the country's armed forces. According to Guinée Matin, by 6 September the military fully controlled the state administration and started to replace the civil administration with its military counterpart. The United Nations, European Union, African Union, ECOWAS (which suspended Guinea's membership) and La Francophonie denounced the coup, and called for President Condé's unconditional release. Similar responses came from some neighboring and Western countries (including the United States), and from China (which relies on Guinea for half of its aluminum ore, facilitated by its connections to President Condé). Despite these, On 1 October 2021, Mamady Doumbouya was sworn in as interim President.

Geography

Guinea shares a border with Guinea-Bissau to the northwest, Senegal to the north, Mali to the northeast, Ivory Coast to the east, Sierra Leone to the southwest and Liberia to the south. The nation forms a crescent as it curves from its southeast region to the north and west, to its northwest border with Guinea-Bissau and southwestern coast on the Atlantic Ocean. The sources of the Niger River, the Gambia River, and the Senegal River are all found in the Guinea Highlands. At , Guinea is roughly the size of the United Kingdom. It lies mostly between latitudes 7° and 13°N, and longitudes 7° and 15°W, with a smaller area that is west of 15°.

Guinea is divided into 4 regions: Maritime Guinea, also known as Lower Guinea or the Basse-Coté lowlands, populated mainly by the Susu ethnic group; the cooler, more mountainous Fouta Djallon that run roughly north–south through the middle of the country, populated by Fulas; the Sahelian Haute-Guinea to the northeast, populated by Malinké; and the forested jungle regions in the southeast, with several ethnic groups. Guinea's mountains are the source for the Niger, the Gambia, and Senegal Rivers, and rivers flowing to the sea on the west side of the range in Sierra Leone and Ivory Coast.

Guinea is home to 5 ecoregions: Guinean montane forests, Western Guinean lowland forests, Guinean forest-savanna mosaic, West Sudanian savanna, and Guinean mangroves. It had a 2019 Forest Landscape Integrity Index mean score of 4.9/10, ranking it 114th globally out of 172 countries.

Wildlife 

The southern part of Guinea lies within the Guinean Forests of West Africa Biodiversity hotspot, while the north-east is characterized by dry savanna woodlands. Declining populations of some animals are restricted to uninhabited distant parts of parks and reserves.

Species found in Guinea include the following:
 Amphibians : Hemisus guineensis, Phrynobatrachus guineensis
 Reptiles : Acanthodactylus guineensis, Mochlus guineensis
 Arachnids: Malloneta guineensis, Dictyna guineensis
 Insects : Zorotypus guineensis, Euchromia guineensis
 Birds: Melaniparus guineensis

Regions and prefectures

It is divided into 4 natural regions with distinct human, geographic, and climatic characteristics:

 Maritime Guinea (La Guinée Maritime) covers 18% of the country.
 Middle Guinea (La Moyenne-Guinée) covers 20% of the country.
 Upper Guinea (La Haute-Guinée) covers 38% of the country.
 Forested Guinea (Guinée forestière) covers 23% of the country, and is both forested and mountainous.

Guinea is divided into 8 administrative regions which are subdivided into 33 prefectures. The capital Conakry with a population of 1,675,069 ranks as a special zone.

Politics

Guinea is a republic. The president is directly elected by the people and is the head of state and the head of government. The unicameral National Assembly is the legislative body of the country, and its members are directly elected by the people. The judicial branch is headed by the Supreme Court of Guinea, the highest and final court of appeal in the country.

The National Assembly of Guinea, the country's legislative body, did not meet from 2008 to 2013, when it was dissolved after the military coup in December. Elections have been postponed multiple times since 2007. In April 2012, President Condé postponed the elections indefinitely, citing the need to ensure that they were "transparent and democratic". The 2013 Guinean legislative election was held on 24 September. President Alpha Condé's party, the Rally of the Guinean People (RPG), won a plurality of seats in the National Assembly of Guinea, with 53 out of 114 seats. The opposition parties won a total of 53 seats, and opposition leaders denounced the official results as fraudulent.

The president of Guinea is normally elected by popular vote for a 5-year term; the winning candidate must receive a majority of the votes cast to be elected president. The president governs Guinea, assisted by a council of 25 civilian ministers, appointed by him. The government administers the country through 8 regions, 33 prefectures, over 100 subprefectures, and districts (known as communes in Conakry and other cities and villages, or quartiers in the interior). District-level leaders are elected; the president appoints officials to all other levels of the centralized administration. Former President Alpha Condé derived support from Guinea's second-largest ethnic group, the Malinke. Guinea's opposition was backed by the Fula ethnic group, who account for around 33.4% of the population.

Foreign relations

Guinea is a member of the African Union, Agency for the French-Speaking Community, African Development Bank, Economic Community of West African States, World Bank, Islamic Development Bank, IMF, and the United Nations.

According to a February 2009 U.S. Department of State statement, Guinea's foreign relations, including those with its West African neighbours, had improved steadily since 1985. The Department's October 2018 statement indicated that—although "the U.S. condemned" Guinea's "2008 military coup d'etat,"—the U.S. had "close relations" with Guinea before the coup, and after "Guinea's presidential elections in 2010, the United States re-established strong diplomatic relations with the government." The statement indicated support for the "legislative elections in 2013 and a second presidential election in 2015," as signs of "democratic reform." A March 2021 report by the U.S. State Department blasted extensive human rights violations by the government, security forces and businesses in Guinea. The report cited extensive international criticism of the recent national elections, which yielded "President Alpha Conde's re-election (despite disputed results)... following a controversial March referendum amending the constitution and allowing him to run for a third term." The Department condemned the 2021 coup, warning that "violence and any extra-constitutional measures will only erode Guinea's prospects for peace, stability, and prosperity, [and] could limit the ability of the United States and Guinea's other international partners to support the country...," While not explicitly calling for President Condé's return to power, the U.S. called for "national dialogue to address concerns sustainably and transparently to enable a peaceful and democratic way forward for Guinea..."

The United Nations promptly denounced the 2021 coup, and some of Guinea's allies condemned the coup. The African Union and West Africa's regional bloc (ECOWAS), both threatened sanctions—while some analysts expect the threats to be of limited effect because Guinea is not a member of the West African currency union, and is not a landlocked country. ECOWAS promptly suspended Guinea's membership, and demanded the unconditional release of President Condé, while sending envoys to Conakry to attempt a "constitutional" resolution of the situation. Uncharacteristically responding to another nation's internal affairs, China (which relies on Guinea for half of its aluminium ore, facilitated by connections to ousted President Condé) openly opposed the coup.

Military

Guinea's armed forces are divided into 5 branches—army, navy, air force, the paramilitary National Gendarmerie and the Republican Guard—whose chiefs report to the Chairman of the Joint Chiefs of Staff who is subordinate to the Minister of Defence. In addition, regime security forces include the National Police Force (Sûreté Nationale). The Gendarmerie, responsible for internal security, has a strength of several thousand.

The army, with about 15,000 personnel, is by far the largest branch of the armed forces and is mainly responsible for protecting the state borders, the security of administered territories, and defending Guinea's national interests. Air force personnel total about 700. Its equipment includes several Russian-supplied fighter planes and transports. The navy has about 900 personnel and operates several small patrol craft and barges.

Human rights

Homosexuality is illegal in Guinea. The prime minister declared in 2010 that he does not consider sexual orientation a legitimate human right.

Guinea has one of the world's highest rates of female genital mutilation (FGM, sometimes referred to as 'female circumcision') according to Anastasia Gage, an associate professor at Tulane University, and Ronan van Rossem, an associate professor at Ghent University. Female genital mutilation in Guinea had been performed on more than 98% of women . In Guinea "almost all cultures, religions, and ethnicities" practice female genital mutilation. The 2005 Demographic and Health Survey reported that 96% of women have gone through the operation.

Economy

Agriculture
The agriculture sector at some point employed approximately 75% of the country. The rice is cultivated in the flooded zones between streams and rivers. The local production of rice is not sufficient to feed the country, so rice is imported from Asia. The sector cultivates coffee beans, pineapples, peaches, nectarines, mangoes, oranges, bananas, potatoes, tomatoes, cucumbers, pepper, and other types of produce. Guinea is one of the emerging regional producers of apples and pears. There are plantations of grapes, pomegranates, and more recent years have seen the development of strawberry plantations, based on the vertical hydroponic system.

Natural resources
Guinea has 25% or more of the world's known bauxite reserves. It has diamonds, gold, and other metals. Bauxite and alumina are the most major exports. Other industries include processing plants for beer, juices, soft drinks and tobacco. Agriculture employs 75% of the nation's labour force. Under French rule, and at the beginning of independence, Guinea was an exporter of bananas, pineapples, coffee, peanuts, and palm oil. Soil, water, and climatic conditions provide opportunities for irrigated farming and agro industry.

Mining

Guinea possesses over 25 billion tonnes (metric tons) of bauxite – and perhaps up to one half of the world's reserves. Its mineral wealth includes more than 4-billion tonnes of high-grade iron ore, and diamond and gold deposits, and uranium. Possibilities for investment and commercial activities exist in all these areas, and Guinea's "poorly developed infrastructure and rampant corruption continue to present obstacles to large-scale investment projects".

Joint venture bauxite mining and alumina operations in north-west Guinea historically provide about 80% of Guinea's Foreign exchange reserves. Bauxite is refined into alumina, which is later smelted into aluminium. The Compagnie des Bauxites de Guinée (CBG) exports about 14 million tonnes of high-grade bauxite annually. CBG is a joint venture, 49% owned by the Guinean government and 51% by an international consortium known as Halco Mining Inc., itself a joint venture controlled by aluminium producer Alcoa (AA), global miner Rio Tinto Group and Dadco Investments. CBG has exclusive rights to bauxite reserves and resources in north-western Guinea, through 2038. In 2008, protesters upset about poor electrical services blocked the tracks CBG uses. Guinea includes a proviso in its agreements with international oil companies, requiring its partners to generate power for nearby communities.The Compagnie des Bauxites de Kindia (CBK), a joint venture between the government of Guinea and RUSAL, produces some 2.5 million tonnes annually, nearly all of which is exported to Russia and Eastern Europe. The Alumina Compagnie de Guinée (ACG) which took over the former Friguia Consortium produced about 2.4 million tonnes in 2004, as raw material for its alumina refinery. The refinery exports about 750,000 tonnes of alumina. Both Global Alumina and Alcoa-Alcan have signed conventions with the government of Guinea to build large alumina refineries, with a combined capacity of about 4 million tonnes per year.
The Simandou mine is an iron ore reserve. In March 2010, Anglo-Australian corporation Rio Tinto Group and its biggest shareholder, Aluminum Corporation of China Limited (Chinalco), signed a preliminary agreement to develop Rio Tinto's iron ore project. In 2017, the Serious Fraud Office (SFO), Britain's anti-fraud regulator, launched an official investigation into Rio Tinto's business and mining practices in Guinea.

Tigui Camara, a former model, is the first woman in Guinea to own a mining company which is partially run as a social enterprise.

Oil
In 2006, Guinea signed a production sharing agreement with Hyperdynamics Corporation of Houston to explore an offshore tract, and was then in partnership with Dana Petroleum PLC (Aberdeen, United Kingdom). The initial well, the Sabu-1, was scheduled to begin drilling in October 2011, at a site in approximately 700 metres of water. The Sabu-1 targeted a 4-way anticline prospect with upper Cretaceous sands, and was anticipated to be drilled to a total depth of 3,600 meters.

Following the completion of exploratory drilling in 2012, the Sabu-1 well was not deemed commercially viable. In November 2012, Hyperdynamics subsidiary SCS reached an agreement for a sale of 40% of the concession to Tullow Oil, bringing ownership shares in the Guinea offshore tract to 37% Hyperdynamics, 40% Tullow Oil, and 23% Dana Petroleum. Hyperdynamics will have until September 2016, under the current agreement, to begin drilling its next selected site, the Fatala Cenomanian turbidite fan prospect.

Tourism

Among the attractions in Guinea are the waterfalls found mostly in the Basse Guinee (Lower Guinea) and Moyenne Guinee (Middle Guinea) regions.

Transport

Conakry International Airport is the largest airport in the country, with flights to other cities in Africa and to Europe.

Built between 1904 and 1910, a railway once linked Conakry to Kankan via Kouroussa ceased operating in 1995 and had been dismantled altogether by 2007 with rails mostly stolen and/or sold for scrap. Plans had at 1 time been mooted for the passenger line to be rehabilitated as part of an iron-ore development master plan and while the start of work was announced in 2010, corruption charges led the whole master plan to be paused and the line was rebuilt as a 105 km mineral railway, paralleling the older route as far as the mines of Kalia. There is a state run mineral railway linking the bauxite mines of Sangarédi to the port of Kamsar (137 km) and a 1960s narrow-gauge line operated by Russian aluminium producer RusAl to the mines at Fria (143 km).

As part of the plans to restart iron ore mining at Simandou blocks 1 and 2, the new development consortium pledged in 2019 to fund the construction of a new heavy-duty standard gauge railway to Matakong on the Atlantic coast where they would invest some US$20 billion in developing a deepwater port. The 650 km route is longer than an alternative heading south to the port of Buchanan, Liberia, which was considered as an alternative in an October 2019 feasibility study. However, the Matakong route would be entirely within Guinea and tied to an agricultural development corridor for citizens along the route.

Some vehicles in Guinea are more than 20 years old, and cabs are any 4-door vehicle which the owner has designated as being for hire. Locals, nearly entirely without vehicles of their own, rely upon these taxis (which charge per seat) and small buses to take them around town and across the country. Horses and donkeys pull carts, primarily to transport construction materials.

Demography

The population of Guinea is estimated at  million. Conakry, the capital and most populous city, is a hub of economy, commerce, education, and culture. In 2014, the total fertility rate (TFR) of Guinea was estimated at 4.93 children born per woman.

The official language of Guinea is French. Pular was spoken by 33.9% of the population in 2018 as their first or native language, followed by Mandingo, with 29.4%. The third most spoken native language is the Susu, spoken by 21.2% of the population in 2018 as their first language. Other languages spoken in Guinea as Guineans native language totalled 16% of the population in 2018, including Kissi and Kpelle.

The population of Guinea comprises about 24 ethnic groups. The Mandinka, also known as Mandingo or Malinké, comprise 29.4% of the population and are mostly found in eastern Guinea concentrated around the Kankan and Kissidougou prefectures. The Fulas or Fulani, comprise 33.4% of the population and are mostly found in the Futa Djallon region. The Soussou, comprising 21.2% of the population, are predominantly in western areas around the capital Conakry, Forécariah, and Kindia. Smaller ethnic groups make up the remaining 16% of the population, including Kpelle, Kissi, Zialo, Toma and others. Approximately 10,000 non-Africans live in Guinea, predominantly Lebanese, French, and other Europeans.

Religion

The population of Guinea is approximately 85% Muslim and 8% Christian, with 7% adhering to indigenous religious beliefs. Some, both Muslim and Christian, have incorporated indigenous African beliefs into their outlook.

The majority of Guinean Muslims are adherent to Sunni Islam, of the Maliki school of jurisprudence, influenced by Sufism. Christian groups include Roman Catholics, Anglicans, Baptists, Seventh-day Adventists, and Evangelical groups. Jehovah's Witnesses are active in the country and recognized by the Government. There is a Baháʼí Faith community. There are numbers of Hindus, Buddhists, and traditional Chinese religious groups among the expatriate community.

There were 3 days of ethno-religious fighting in the city of Nzerekore in July 2013. Fighting between ethnic Kpelle who are Christian or animist, and ethnic Konianke who are Muslims and close to the larger Malinke ethnic group, left at least 54 dead. The dead included people who were killed with machetes and burned alive. The violence ended after the Guinea military imposed a curfew, and President Conde made a televised appeal for calm.

Education

In 2010 it was estimated that 41% of adults were literate (52% of males and 30% of females).
Primary education is compulsory for 6 years. In 1999, primary school attendance was 40%. Children, particularly girls, are kept out of school to assist their parents with domestic work or agriculture, or to be married: Guinea has "one of the highest rates" of child marriage in the world.

Health

Ebola

In 2014, an outbreak of the Ebola virus occurred in Guinea. In response, the health ministry banned the sale and consumption of bats, thought to be carriers of the disease. The virus eventually spread from rural areas to Conakry, and by June 2014 had spread to neighbouring countries - Sierra Leone and Liberia. In August 2014 Guinea closed its borders to Sierra Leone and Liberia to help contain the spread of the virus, as more new cases of the disease were being reported in those countries than in Guinea.

The outbreak began in December in a village called Meliandou, southeastern Guinea, near the borders with Liberia and Sierra Leone. The first known case involved a 2-year-old child who died, after fever and vomiting and passing black stool, on 6 December. The child's mother died a week later, then a sister and a grandmother, all with symptoms that included fever, vomiting, and diarrhoea. Then, by way of care-giving visits or attendance at funerals, the outbreak spread to other villages.

"Unsafe burials" is a source of the transmission of the disease. The World Health Organization (WHO) reported that the inability to engage with local communities hindered the ability of health workers to trace the origins and strains of the virus.

While WHO terminated the Public Health Emergency of International Concern (PHEIC) on 29 March 2016, the Ebola Situation Report released on 30 March confirmed 5 more cases in the preceding 2 weeks, with viral sequencing relating 1 of the cases to the November 2014 outbreak.

The Ebola epidemic affected the treatment of other diseases in Guinea. Healthcare visits by the population declined due to fear of infection and to mistrust in the health-care system, and the system's ability to provide routine health-care and HIV/AIDS treatments decreased due to the Ebola outbreak.

Ebola re-emerged in Guinea in January–February 2021.

Maternal and child healthcare
The 2021 maternal mortality rate per 100,000 births for Guinea is 576. This is compared with 680 in 2010, 859.9 in 2008 and 964.7 in 1990. The under 5 mortality rate, per 1,000 births is 146 and the neonatal mortality as a percentage of under 5's mortality is 29. In Guinea the number of midwives per 1,000 live births is 1 and the lifetime risk of death for pregnant women is 1 in 26. Guinea has the second highest prevalence of female genital mutilation in the world.

HIV/AIDS

An estimated 170,000 adults and children were infected at the end of 2004. Surveillance surveys conducted in 2001 and 2002 show higher rates of HIV in urban areas than in rural areas. Prevalence was highest in Conakry (5%) and in the cities of the Forest Guinea region (7%) bordering Côte d'Ivoire, Liberia, and Sierra Leone.

HIV is spread primarily through multiple-partner heterosexual intercourse. Men and women are at nearly equal risk for HIV, with people aged 15 to 24 most vulnerable. Surveillance figures from 2001 to 2002 show the rates among commercial sex workers (42%), active military personnel (6.6%), truck drivers and bush taxi drivers (7.3%), miners (4.7%), and adults with tuberculosis (8.6%).

Several factors were attributed to what fuel the HIV/AIDS epidemic in Guinea. They include unprotected sex, multiple sexual partners, illiteracy, endemic poverty, unstable borders, refugee migration, lack of civic responsibility, and scarce medical care and public services.

Malnutrition
A 2012 study reported malnutrition rates with levels ranging from 34% to 40% by region, and acute malnutrition rates above 10% in Upper Guinea's mining zones. The survey showed that 139,200 children underwent acute malnutrition, 609,696 underwent chronic malnutrition and further 1,592,892 have anemia. Degradation of care practices, limited access to medical services, inadequate hygiene practices and a lack of food diversity were said to explain these levels.

Malaria
Malaria is transmitted year-round, with peak transmission from July through October. It is a cause of disability in Guinea.

COVID-19 pandemic

The first case of COVID-19 was reported in Guinea on 13 March 2020. By the end of 2020 the total number of confirmed cases was 13,722. Of these, 13,141 had recovered, 500 were active, and 81 people had died.

Culture

Sports 
Football is the "most popular sport" in the country of Guinea, alongside basketball.

Football operations are run by the Guinean Football Federation. The association administers the national football team, and the national league. It was founded in 1960 and affiliated with FIFA since 1962 and with the Confederation of African Football since 1963.

The Guinea national football team, nicknamed Syli nationale (National Elephants), have played international football since 1962. Their first opponent was East Germany. They have yet to reach World Cup finals, and were runners-up to Morocco in the Africa Cup of Nations in 1976.

Guinée Championnat National is the top division of Guinean football. Since it was established in 1965, 3 teams have dominated in winning the Guinée Coupe Nationale. Horoya AC has at least 16 titles and is the 2017–2018 champion. Hafia FC (known as Conakry II in 1960s) has at least 15 titles, having dominated in 1960s and 70s. AS Kaloum Star (known as Conakry I in the 1960s) has at least 13 titles. All 3 teams are based in the capital, Conakry.

Hafia FC won the African Cup of Champions Clubs 3 times, in 1972, 1975 and 1977, while Horoya AC won the 1978 African Cup Winners' Cup.

Polygamy 

Polygamy is generally prohibited by law in Guinea, and there are exceptions. In 2020, it was estimated that about 26% of marriages were polygamous (29% Muslim and 10% Christian).

Cuisine 

Guinean cuisine varies by region with rice as a staple. Cassava is consumed. Part of West African cuisine, the foods of Guinea include yétissé, peanut sauce , okra sauce and tapalapa bread. In rural areas, food is eaten from a "large serving dish" and eaten by hand outside of homes.

See also

 Outline of Guinea
 Index of Guinea-related articles

References

Notes

External links

  
 Guinea. The World Factbook. Central Intelligence Agency.
 Guinea from UCB Libraries GovPubs
 
 Guinea profile from the BBC News
 
 
 Guinea 2008 Summary Trade Statistics

 
1958 establishments in Guinea
Countries in Africa
Economic Community of West African States
Central African countries
French-speaking countries and territories
Least developed countries
Member states of the African Union
Member states of the Organisation internationale de la Francophonie
Member states of the Organisation of Islamic Cooperation
Member states of the United Nations
Republics
States and territories established in 1958
West African countries